John Arthur Hetherington (7 August 1906–1977) was an English footballer who played in the Football League for Preston North End, Swindon Town, Watford and Wolverhampton Wanderers.

References

1906 births
1977 deaths
English footballers
Association football forwards
English Football League players
Shirebrook Miners Welfare F.C. players
Mexborough Athletic F.C. players
Gainsborough Trinity F.C. players
Denaby United F.C. players
Mansfield Town F.C. players
Wolverhampton Wanderers F.C. players
Preston North End F.C. players
Swindon Town F.C. players
Watford F.C. players